The 1933 Marshall Thundering Herd football team was an American football team that represented Marshall College (now Marshall University) as a member of the Buckeye Conference during the 1933 college football season. In its third season under head coach Tom Dandelet, the Thundering Herd compiled a 3–5–1 record (1–3–1 against conference opponents), and outscored opponents by a total of 109 to 103. Marvin Wooley was the team captain.

Schedule

References

Marshall
Marshall Thundering Herd football seasons
Marshall Thundering Herd football